{|

|-
|Ship returned:
|23 April 1946
|-

|}
USCGC Itasca was a Lake-class cutter of the United States Coast Guard launched on 16 November 1929 and commissioned 12 July 1930. It acted as "picket ship" supporting Amelia Earhart's 1937 world flight attempt.

Career 
In USCG service, Itasca performed Bering Sea patrols.

In 1934 it was used to settle the first wave of colonists that were involved in the American Equatorial Islands Colonization Project.

It is most remembered as the "picket ship" that would provide air navigation and radio links for  Amelia Earhart when she made her 1937 attempt to fly around the world. Itasca, stationed at Howland Island, tried to keep in radio contact with her but radio reception was intermittent. On 2 July 1937 Itasca received the last transmission from Earhart's aircraft and after receiving no further messages she assumed that the aircraft had gone into the ocean. Itasca immediately headed to the area of the last radio transmission and started search operations northward of Howland Island. Itasca and other Navy and Coast Guard vessels continued the search operation in the area until 16 July when the search was called off.

Itasca was decommissioned on lend lease to the United Kingdom where she received a name change, becoming HMS Gorleston (Y92) after the East Anglian port of Gorleston on 30 May 1941. After escorting convoys OS 4, SL 87, OS 10, SL 93, OS 12, SL 95, OS 17, SL 100, OS 22, SL 106, OS 28, SL 112, OS 34 and SL 118 on this eastern Atlantic route, Gorleston made a trip to Iceland escorting convoys DS 33 and SD 33, and escorted convoys KMF 3, MKF 3, KMF 5, MKF 5, KMF 7 and MKF 7 between England and the Mediterranean Sea in support of Operation Torch.

Gorleston then resumed escorting eastern Atlantic and Mediterranean convoys until refit in Wales in December 1943. After refit, Gorleston escorted eastern Mediterranean convoys from March 1944 until assigned to the Kilindini Escort Force in August 1944. Gorleston escorted Arabian Sea convoys until transferred to Colombo in June 1945. Gorleston spent the remainder of the war escorting Bay of Bengal convoys in support of Operation Zipper.

Gorleston was returned to the United States on 23 April 1946 and redesignated USCGC Itasca until scrapped in 1950.

See also
 Air navigation
 Fred Noonan
 List of United States Coast Guard cutters
 Radio navigation
 S meter / Signal strength

References

Citations

Bibliography

 Lenton, H.T. and J. J. Colledge. British and Dominion Warships of World War II. London: Ian Allan, 1973, First edition 1964. .
 Long, Elgen M. and Marie K. Amelia Earhart: The Mystery Solved. New York: Simon & Schuster, 1999. .
 Lovell, Mary S. The Sound of Wings. New York: St. Martin's Press, 1989. .
 Pellegrino, Anne Holtgren. World Flight: The Amelia Trail. Ames, Iowa: The Iowa State University Press, 1971. .
 The Radio Amateur's Handbook. West Hartford, Connecticut: American Radio Relay League, 1945. No ISBN.
 Safford, Laurance F. with Warren, Cameron A. and Payne, Robert R. Earhart's Flight into Yesterday: The Facts Without the Fiction, McLean, Virginia: Paladwr Press, 2003. .

External links
U.S. Coast Guard Historian's Office

Lake-class cutters
Ships built in Alameda, California
1929 ships
Gorleston
World War II sloops of the United Kingdom